Cecil Roberts (1892–1976) was an English writer

Cecil Roberts may also refer to:

Cecil Roberts (labor unionist) (born 1946), American miner and union leader
Cecil Roberts (politician) (1877–1961), Australian politician

See also 

 Robert Cecil (disambiguation)